The Eagle's Claw is a 1924 American silent Western film starring Guinn "Big Boy" Williams. It was produced and directed by Charles R. Seeling.

The film is preserved in a foreign archive in Brussels. On DVD it is available from the Grapevine company at Phoenix.

Cast
 Guinn "Big Boy" Williams - Dan Carson (as Big Boy Williams)
 Lew Meehan - Zac Wilson(as Bill Guinn)
 Lafe McKee - John Sherwood

DVD release
The Eagle's Claw was released on Region 0 DVD-R by Alpha Video on July 7, 2015.

References

External links
 
 
 Lobby card(Wayback Machine)

1924 films
1924 Western (genre) films
American black-and-white films
Films directed by Charles R. Seeling
Silent American Western (genre) films
1920s American films
1920s English-language films